Never Ending Summer (Japanese: ネヴァーエンディングサマー; stylized as NEVER ENDING SUMMER) is the third studio album by Kiyotaka Sugiyama & Omega Tribe, released by VAP on December 21, 1984. The album features the single, "Riverside Hotel," which peaked at #21 on the Oricon charts, while the album itself peaked at #8.

Background 
A third album featuring the smash hit "Riverside Hotel", which has been modified to the original line of the debut album. However, from the lyrics scene and the release date, the content of the image is "winter OMEGA" even though the theme is summer. The picture of the jacket was taken in the sea of Guam.

On the A side, vocalist Kiyotaka Sugiyama worked on all songs except for "Riverside Hotel."

The B-side is a series of works titled "Never Ending Summer," written by Yasushi Akimoto and composed by Tetsuji Hayashi, and depicts the men and women who met in the summer parting and trying to meet again. The suite was created by Hayashi with the intention of producer Fujita. The work of connecting "Never Ending Summer I" to "Never Ending Summer IV" was difficult, since the transposing pattern in the song like "Never Ending Summer II" was also rare at that time. In "Never Ending Summer III," the atmosphere of the melody was similar to that of Sugiyama's own work. Sugiyama's ability is fully demonstrated in the "Never Ending Summer IV" ballad. In this work, four songs are connected in a medley format to form one song, but there are independent versions other than "Never Ending Summer III." In the next single "Futari no Natsu Monogatari", the subtitle is "Never Ending Summer", but the lyricist is different, so it is not relevant.

The album peaked at #8 on the Oricon charts, lower than the previous album, River's Island, but exceeded the number of sales. It was ranked #22 on the 1985 Annual Album Chart.

Track listing

Personnel 

Executive Producers: Katsuhiko Endo, Atsushi Kitamura
Directors: Shigeru Matsuhashi, Ken Shiguma
Arrangers: Ken Shiguma, Makoto Matsushita, Horn Spectrum (horns), Ichiro Nitta (horns)
Bass – Takao Oshima
Drums, Percussion – Keiichi Hiroshi
Guitar – Kenji Yoshida, Shinji Takashima
Keyboards  – Toshitsugu Nishihara
Sound Advisor: Tetusji Hayashi
Mixing Engineer: Kunihiko "Jr" Shimizu
Overdub Engineers: Jun Wakao, Tatsuo Sekine, Hiroshi Fujita
Second Engineer: Mizuo "Tamadon" Miura
Mixing Studio: Nichine C Studio
Recording Studio: Nichine, Sound In, Sound City etc.
Digital Recorder: Sony PCM-3324 (24ch), JVC DAS-900 (Master)
Artist Management: Triangle Production
Session Coordination: Sound Seven
Photographers: Tadayasu Ozawa (Front cover), Jushi Watanabe (Back cover)
Stylist: Atsuko Shimizu (Back cover)
Design: Takeharu Tanaka, Yumiko Ohta

Charts

References 

1984 albums
Omega Tribe (Japanese band) albums